John Reade was a Canadian writer.

John Reade may also refer to:

John Reade (politician) (died 1557)
John Edmund Reade (1800–1870), English poet and novelist
Sir John Reade, 1st Baronet (c. 1616–1694)
Sir John Reade, 3rd Baronet (1691–1712) of the Reade baronets
Sir John Reade, 5th Baronet (1721–1773) of the Reade baronets
Sir John Reade, 6th Baronet (1762–1789) of the Reade baronets
Sir John Chandos Reade, 7th Baronet (1785–1868) of the Reade baronets
Sir John Reade, 11th Baronet (1896–1958) of the Reade baronets

See also
John Read (disambiguation)
John Rede (disambiguation)
John Reed (disambiguation)
John Reid (disambiguation)